Pielgrzymów  is a small village located in southwestern Poland, within Głubczyce County, Opole Voivodeship, near the border with the Czech Republic.

History
The present-day Polish village Pielgrzymów and the present-day Czech former village Pelhřimovy, directly across the Czech side of the border, were once a single village. After the Silesian Wars, the newly drawn border divided the village in two. The division continued through the Communist era of 1945–1989, and the border was not easily crossed until the two countries joined the Schengen Area in 2007.

This village partition led to an incident in 2020 during the COVID-19 pandemic, when the Polish Army entered some parts of the Czech village as a result of a misunderstanding. They "occupied" parts of the village for two weeks. During this time, several Czech citizens were unable to access the area, and the dilapidated chapel located some 30 meters behind the border.

References

Villages in Głubczyce County
Czech Republic–Poland border crossings